Lincoln High School, founded in 1954, is Lincoln Unified School District's only comprehensive high school. The school serves approximately 3,500 students from ethnically and socio-economically diverse populations.

Facilities

 Alex G. Spanos Stadium
 In 2008, Lincoln High  completed construction of a one-story armory.
 Ruhl Family Clubhouse
 Richard De Long Aquatic Complex

Academics

Each student is required to take some basic courses including but not limited to the following:
 4 years of English
 2 years of Mathematics
 2 years of Physical Education
 2 years of Science (one life science course and one physical science course)
 4 years of Social Science (including World Geography/Health, World History, US History, and American Government/Economics)
 2 years of Career/Technical Education, Visual/Performing Art, or World Language

and 8 additional elective courses.

Most academic courses are college prep, honors, or Advanced Placement (AP).
AP courses offered include: English Language & Composition, English Literature & Composition, Calculus AB, Calculus BC, Statistics, Biology, Chemistry, Human Geography, World History, US History, United States Government & Politics, Spanish Language & Culture Studio Art, Music Theory, Computer Science A, and Computer Science Principles.

UC/CSU-approved Honors Courses include:
Introduction to Analysis, Spanish 3, Chemistry, Physics, and Wind Ensemble.

History
Lincoln High School began on the campus of the College of the Pacific in 1954 and then moved in 1958 to 1956 Stanton Way under then superintendent Mable Barron. In 1964 the current campus at 6844 Alexandria Place was completed and has been home to the school ever since.

Extracurriculars
The school has over 50 organizations, teams and clubs. These clubs have focuses on academics, culture, recreational, and student interest.

Visual and Performing Arts 
Lincoln High School has a Visual & Performing Arts Department. Students with interests in the arts are offered courses in music (band, choir, orchestra, piano, guitar, electronic music and music theory), performing arts (acting, stagecraft, production, oral interpretation, and speech and debate) and visual arts (traditional and computer art, photography and ceramics).

Student Publications
The student body newspaper, The Lincolnan, is both printed and published online monthly by the Newspaper Production class.

Notable alumni

 Ricky Barnes, 1999, professional golfer (US Amateur champion 2002) 
 Mike Bruner, 1974, Olympic gold medal swimmer 
David Callaway, 1973, physicist and mountaineer
 Shante Carver, 1989, National Football League (NFL) player (Dallas Cowboys) 
Rachelle B. Chong, former member of the Federal Communications Commission (FCC)
 Brandin Cooks, wide receiver for the Houston Texans
 Justin Davis, 2013, professional football player (Los Angeles Rams) 
 Ed Fisher, 1969, NFL player (Houston Oilers) 
 Kurt Fuller, 1971, actor 
 Mark Gantt, 1986, actor and producer
 Dirk Hamilton, 1967, folk musician
 Bob Heinz, 1964, NFL player (Miami Dolphins) 
 Dean Kremer, 2013, Israeli-American major league baseball starting pitcher (Baltimore Orioles)
 Tommy McClendon, 1972, lead guitarist of rock band UFO from 1984-1988
 Mike Macfarlane, 1982, Major League Baseball player (Kansas City Royals, Boston Red Sox & Oakland Athletics)
 Adam Melhuse, 1990, Major League Baseball player (Colorado Rockies, Oakland Athletics, Chicago Cubs)-GM Chicago Cubs organization
 Louis Rankin, 2003, professional football player (Oakland Raiders & Seattle Seahawks) 
 Bill Sandeman, 1961, NFL player (Atlanta Falcons)
 Kristin Smart, 1995, missing person
 Dean Spanos, 1968, President/CEO of the San Diego Chargers
 Roderick Townsend-Roberts, 2010, paralympic professional track and field athlete, 2015 US  national team, 3 time USA champion
 Heather Unruh, 1985, journalist and former television news anchor at WCVB (Boston, MA)
 Anthony Veasna So, 2010, author

Notes

High schools in San Joaquin County, California
Education in Stockton, California
Public high schools in California
1954 establishments in California
Educational institutions established in 1954